Lokalavisa Verran–Namdalseid was a local online and print newspaper in published in Malm, Norway. It covered the municipalities of Verran and Namdalseid, and the area of Beitstad in Steinkjer. Published in tabloid format, the newspaper had a circulation of 2,165 in 2013. The newspaper was owned by Trønder-Avisa. It had one weekly issue. The newspaper was founded in 2009.

In August 2017 the newspaper merged with Steinkjer-Avisa.

References

Newspapers published in Norway
Verran
Namdalseid
Mass media in Trøndelag
Newspapers established in 2009
2009 establishments in Norway
Norwegian-language newspapers